Takah may refer to:
 Taqah, Oman
 Takah, West Azerbaijan, Iran